"Mercy" is a song by Canadian singer-songwriter Shawn Mendes. It was co-written by Mendes with Ilsey Juber, Danny Parker and Teddy Geiger, with the latter handling the song's production with Jake Gosling. It was released on August 18, 2016, through Island Records as the third promotional single, and later as the second single on October 18, 2016, from his second studio album, Illuminate (2016).

Composition
"Mercy" is written in the key of E minor with a common time tempo of 144 to 152 beats per minute. Mendes's vocals span from B2 to A4 in the song.

Music video
On September 21, 2016, a music video directed by Jay Martin was released. It features Mendes singing, switching between him drowning in a locked car in the ocean and him performing the song with instruments in a warehouse shot at TriBro Studios.

Cover versions 
In October 2016, Muslim Nasheed artist Siedd released a cover version of 'Mercy' on YouTube. The song which has over 1 million views on YouTube features a modern style a capella arrangement with rewritten lyrics to reflect his Islamic faith.

Chart performance
In the United States, the song peaked at number 15 on the Billboard Hot 100 and was the second single from Illuminate to reach the top 20. It also peaked at number 13 in Australia, number 15 in the UK and number 23 in Canada.

Live performances
Mendes performed the song for the first time on The Tonight Show Starring Jimmy Fallon on September 22, 2016, backed by mallet drums, electric guitar, bass and piano. The singer later performed the song on Today on September 23, The Late Late Show with James Corden on September 28, The X Factor UK on October 23, and The X Factor Australia on October 31 as well as Saturday Night Live on December 3. Mendes performed the song live at the Juno Awards of 2017; this version was subsequently released as a digital download. On May 27, 2018, Mendes and singer James Bay performed the song together at BBC Music's Biggest Weekend.

Track listing

Charts

Weekly charts

Year-end charts

Certifications

Release history

References

2016 songs
2016 singles
Shawn Mendes songs
Island Records singles
Universal Music Group singles
Rock ballads
Torch songs
Songs written by Ilsey Juber
Songs written by Teddy Geiger
Songs written by Danny Parker (songwriter)
Songs written by Shawn Mendes